The Yellow River Piano Concerto is a piano concerto arranged by a collaboration between Chinese composers, including Yin Chengzong and Chu Wanghua, and based on the Yellow River Cantata by composer Xian Xinghai. It was originally directed by Jiang Qing, wife of Chairman Mao, and since its highly acclaimed premiere in 1970 during the Cultural Revolution the Concerto has become popular in China and around the globe. It is noted for its revolutionary theme that integrates a classic post-romantic music structure with passion, beauty and power, along with highly skilled solo phases. The piano concerto is meant to represent the very fighting spirit of Chinese people and the determination of a new-born nation, in the context of a long, vividly struggling history of the Yellow River.

Background
Xian Xinghai wrote the Yellow River Cantata at Yan'an in 1939, allegedly in a cave in just six days, during the Sino-Japanese War (1937–1945). It is an eight-movement piece in which he used traditional folk-melodies and evoked the image of the  Yellow River as a symbol of Chinese defiance against the Japanese invaders. During his stay in Russia, he edited and re-orchestrated the work, which was later modified by Li Huanzhi, Qu Wei, and Yan Liangkun. This edition aimed at furthering the energy and momentum of the music, and in this light the rearrangement of the Yellow River Piano Concerto thirty years later is merely a continuation of that same practice.

Since the establishment of the People's Republic of China, Xian Xinghai together with Nie Er (who wrote the Chinese national anthem, the "March of the Volunteers") were regarded by Mao Zedong and Zhou Enlai as "the people's musicians" and were the most prestigious composers of the PRC. Yet, even the Yellow River Cantata was banned from performance during the Cultural Revolution (1966–1976); the Central Philharmonic Orchestra was forbidden to perform any Western orchestral pieces and its professional musicians were left with nothing to do. Under such circumstances, the pianist Yin Chengzong loaded his piano onto a truck and drove it to Tiananmen Square to accompany revolutionary songs that were sung at the time. He caught the eye of Jiang Qing (better known in the West as Madame Mao), which resulted in the work The Legend of the Red Lantern to be accompanied by the piano. Under orders of Madame Mao, a collective of musicians from the Central Philharmonic Society including Yin Chengzong (殷承宗), Liu Zhuang (刘庄), Chu Wanghua (储望华), Sheng Lihong (盛礼洪), Shi Shucheng (石叔诚), and Xu Feixing (许斐星) rearranged the cantata into a four-movement piano concerto:

 Prelude: The Song of the Yellow River Boatmen (黄河船夫曲)
 Ode To the Yellow River (黄河頌)
 The Yellow River In Anger (黄河憤)
 Defend the Yellow River (保衛黄河)
 
However, Madame Mao thought that the work could be improved, thence the standard performing edition (1970) was created, a piece more politically loaded and musically more conventional.

With the official end of the Cultural Revolution in 1976, the Yellow River Piano Concerto was banished from the Chinese concert stage, retaining a certain popularity outside China. Nevertheless, by the late 1980s it was filtering back into the Chinese musical mainstream, usually in the form of new performing editions, new recordings, and live performances by Chinese and Western artists. Apart from changes in the orchestration, the main differences between the various editions have been what the editors have done with the anthems integrated in the finale.

Summary

Prelude: The Song of the Yellow River Boatman
"The Song of the Yellow River Boatmen" describes the momentum of the terrifying waves of the Yellow River and uses the rapid chromatic crescendo and long rolls of the timpani and cymbals typical of the eight model plays model operas.

Ode to the Yellow River
The original heroic tenor solo melody of the "Ode to the Yellow River" is sung in praise of the history and presence of the Yellow River, signifying the cultural pride of the Chinese. This broad Chinese recitative is supported by the deep and rich timbre of the cello, and is considered as an example of the nationalistic style. Before the coda, the opening motif from the Chinese National Anthem is included in the trombone part.

The Wrath of the Yellow River 
"The Wrath of the Yellow River", originally sung by a soprano solo, begins with a dizi solo accompanied by the piano. This is obviously inspired by the Jiangnan melody of the Butterfly Lovers' Violin Concerto, but rewritten in the style of northwest Shanbei folk idioms. In the third movement, the piano brings out the melody taken from the "Ballad of the Yellow Rivers", originally a mellow number sung by female chorus. We then hear the "Lament at the Yellow River" taking over for this movement.

Defend the Yellow River
As the finale of this piano concerto, the theme is arranged into a polyphonic canon. It is also apparent that the tune from "The East is Red" is persistent throughout the entire movement; among the various versions of the Yellow River Concerto that are currently in circulation, including Yin Chengzong's film recording, we can hear a recapitulation of the theme of "Defending the Yellow River" played canonically against the strings after the climatic tutti of "The East is Red". Then the first phrase of "The East is Red" is played by the trumpet, and tightly followed by the final phrase of the "Internationale", as an example of thematic writing huan wei (換尾; literally "Changing the end") that is often found in traditional Chinese music.

Instrumentation
The concerto is scored for a solo piano and orchestra of piccolo, dizi (Chinese flute), 2 flutes, 2 oboes, 2 clarinets (in B-flat), 2 bassoons, 4 horns (in F), 2 trumpets (in B-flat), 3 trombones, timpani, triangle, cymbals (suspended), harp, pipa (though not all editions of the score show this), and strings.

Notable recordings
 Ilana Vered pianist with National Philharmonic Orchestra conducted by Elgar Howarth
 Xiang-Dong Kong pianist with China Philharmonic Orchestra conducted by Mak Ka Lok
 Lang Lang pianist with China Philharmonic Orchestra conducted by Long Yu
 Yundi Li pianist with China NCPA Concert Hall Orchestra conducted by Zuochuang Chen
 Shi Shucheng pianist with Central Philharmonic Society of China conducted by Han Zhongjie
 Yin Chengzong pianist with Czecho-Slovak Radio Symphony Orchestra conducted by Adrian Leaper
 Daniel Epstein pianist with The Philadelphia Orchestra conducted by Eugene Ormandy

Historical performances
 The Austrian-Taiwanese pianist Ruei-Bin Chen was the designated soloist who performed the Yellow River Concerto at the Expo 2010, with Shanghai Chinese Orchestra conducted by Wang Fujian.

See also
Chinese orchestra

References

External links
 Xinghai Yellow River Piano Concerto
 The Review for Shanghai Chinese Orchestra's The Ballad of Spring II Concert, 2010

Piano concertos
Chinese classical music
1939 compositions